Bowoto Jephthah Oluwatiseyifumi Tanimola, popularly known as Akpororo, is a Nigerian stand-up comedian, vocalist and actor.

Early life and career 
Akpororo was born 3 October 1989, he is a native of Ilaje, Ondo State, Nigeria but he was born and brought up in Warri, a city in Delta State, Nigeria where he had his early education. His career started off as a local gospel musician until in 2008 when he went into the National Comedy Challenge by Opa Williams and went on to win the Calabar zone of the competition.

In 2009, Akpororo moved to Lagos and contested twice in the AY's Open Mic Challenge, coming second in his first try and winning the competition in his second try. He rose to popularity in 2013 following his performance at "Basketmouth's Laff and Jam" show and went on to perform in several comedy shows including "AY Live". He is 5 ft, 7 inches. On 12 August 2014, he staged his first major comedy show "Akpororo vs Akpororo" at the Shell Hall, MUSON Centre. The maiden event saw the attendance of notable musical acts and comedians.

In 2014, Akpororo delved into acting, starring in the films Headgone and The Antique; with the former earning him three nominations at the 2015 Golden Icons Academy Movie Awards.

Artistry
His style of comedy is basically the fusion of secular and church-related jokes. In an interview, he revealed that he performs and cracks jokes about lunatics because he was once an attendant to mentally-ill people who came to the church he was attending for spiritual healing.

Endorsement deals
In June 2015, he signed a 2-year endorsement deal with telecommunication giants Airtel Nigeria.

Awards and nominations

Personal life
He is married to Josephine Ijeoma Abraham, following their wedding in Surulere, Lagos State on 14 November 2015. He is a student of Lagos State University where he is studying Sociology.

See also
 List of Nigerian comedians
 List of Yoruba people

References

Living people
Nigerian male comedians
Nigerian male film actors
People from Warri
People from Ondo State
Lagos State University alumni
Year of birth missing (living people)
Nigerian stand-up comedians
Actors from Ondo State